Johnny Morrison may refer to:
Johnny Morrison (baseball) (1895–1966)
Johnny Morrison (footballer) (1911–1984)
 Johnny E. Morrison, American judge for the Third Circuit of Virginia
John Morrison (wrestler) (born 1979), sometimes referred to as Johnny Morrison

See also
John Morrison (disambiguation)